Carly Ann Wray is an American television writer and producer. She is known for her writing on the AMC drama Mad Men and The Leftovers on HBO. She won a Writers Guild of America Award for Dramatic Series for Mad Men in 2016, and was nominated for an Emmy for Outstanding Drama Series along with the producing staff of Westworld in 2018.

Professional career

A graduate of Reed College and the USC School of Cinematic Arts, Wray started her career in television as a writer's assistant on Mad Men in 2012. Promoted to staff writer after a year, Wray co-wrote her first script, "In Care Of", with Matthew Weiner, before going on to write two additional episodes in the show's final seasons, "Waterloo" and "The Milk and Honey Route".

After her work on Mad Men, Wray joined the staff of the first season of Constantine, a David Goyer production for NBC, based on the long-running Hellblazer comic. Freelance film and television critic Logan Dalton praised Wray's writing in the mid-season finale, saying that she "connect[ed] many of the dots for the 'Rising Darkness' and end[ed] the episode on a note that will make viewers want to tune in when the show returns".

Wray returned to cable after Constantines cancellation, writing episodes of Kurt Sutter's The Bastard Executioner for FX, and the David Fincher series Mindhunter, a Netflix drama based on the works of legendary FBI profiler John Douglas. She then became a co-producer on the third and final season of The Leftovers and a producer on the second season of Westworld on HBO.

On May 4, 2017, HBO announced that Wray is one of four writers working on a potential pilot for a Game of Thrones spin-off. In addition to Wray, Max Borenstein, Jane Goldman, and Brian Helgeland are also working on potential pilots. Wray has been working and communicating with George R. R. Martin, the author of A Song of Ice and Fire, the series of novels upon which the original series is based. Upon the announcement, Indiewire critic Ben Travers praised the idea of Wray as a writer for the ongoing adaptations: "Wray can nudge the franchise in a new direction, since Game of Thrones has been a boys' club for most of its journey thus far. Bringing in a female perspective is a great idea, especially with so many female characters to explore in a spin-off — and especially with a candidate like Wray readying a script." Current Game of Thrones showrunners D. B. Weiss and David Benioff would also be executive producers for whichever project is picked up by HBO.

In 2018, Wray sold a feature film script based on the New York Times article "The Incarcerated Women Who Fight California's Wildfires" by Jaime Lowe, with Margot Robbie's Lucky Chap producing. She also began work on You Know You Want This, an anthology series based on Kristen Roupenian's short stories, for HBO.

Wray is currently Co-Executive Producer on Damon Lindelof's upcoming Watchmen adaptation.

Works

Television

Film

Personal life 
She lives with her husband in Los Angeles, California.

References

External links
 
 

Living people
21st-century American women writers
Women science fiction and fantasy writers
Year of birth missing (living people)
American television writers